Nohab (also Romanized as Nahob and Nohob; also known as Nūhūm) is a village in the Dodangeh-ye Sofla Rural District of Ziaabad District, Takestan County, Qazvin Province, Iran. At the 2006 census, its population was 341, in 105 families.

References 

Populated places in Takestan County